Mumbai Football Arena is a football stadium in Mumbai, India. It is located in the Andheri Sports Complex. It is one of the only few dedicated football stadiums in the country, which has been hugely appreciated by football pundits and has hosted many games for the national team.

Routine usage
It serves as the home stadium of Mumbai City FC of the Indian Super League. The football stadium holds 6,600 spectators for many ISL games and was expected to be one of the venues for the 2017 FIFA U-17 World Cup. The India national football team played a FIFA international friendly on 3 September 2016 beating Puerto Rico national football team  4–1 in front of a packed stadium. This was the first international friendly hosted by the city in 61 years.

Notable events
The stadium also hosted the 2017 Hero Tri-Nation Series between India, Saint Kitts and Nevis and Mauritius, which was won by India after topping the table.

It hosted the 2019 Indian Super League Final featuring Bengaluru FC and FC Goa. Bengaluru F.C won the match due to a late goal from defender Rahul Bheke. This was Bengaluru F.C's first Indian Super League after losing in the final the previous year.

It was one of the host venues of 2022 AFC Women's Asian Cup.

In June 2018, the stadium hosted all 7 matches of the 2018 Intercontinental Cup, in which the Indian men's football team played against Kenya, New Zealand, and Chinese Taipei in a four-way tournament. India beat Kenya 2–0 in the final to win the tournament.
The stadium was sold out for all the games after the first home game against Chinese Taipei after Sunil Chhetri made an emotional appeal asking the fans to come and watch the national team play in the stadium.

Redevelopment
Aditya Thackeray, a local politician, and Bollywood star Ranbir Kapoor are known to have played an important role in the redevelopment of the stadium.

Design and atmosphere
Before the beginning of 2022-23 Indian Super League season, the stadium was renovated and bucket seats were installed throughout the stadium, giving it an even attractive look.
The stadium is hugely appreciated by fans and players alike for it catering an electric atmosphere whenever a match is held there.

References

https://en.wikipedia.org/wiki/File:Mumbai_Football_Arena.jpg

Sports venues in Mumbai
Football venues in Maharashtra
Indian Super League stadiums
Sports venues completed in 1988
1988 establishments in Maharashtra
20th-century architecture in India